Four ships of the Royal Navy have borne the name HMS Amelia, whilst another was planned:

 was a 38-gun fifth rate, previously the French frigate Proserpine, launched in 1785.
 was an  wooden screw gunboat launched in 1856 and broken up in 1865.
HMS Amelia was previously , a coastguard vessel launched in 1851, renamed HMS Amelia in 1872, HMS Fanny in 1889, used as a boom defence vessel from 1902, and sold in 1907.
HMS Amelia was previously  a coastguard gunboat launched in 1869.  She was renamed HMS Amelia in 1888, HMS Colleen in 1905, HMS Colleen Old in 1916, HMS Emerald in 1918 and HMS Cuckoo later in 1918 before being sold in 1922.
HMS Amelia was to have been a Catherine-class minesweeper.

See also
 

Royal Navy ship names